Neffs is a small village located mainly in North Whitehall Township but also in Washington Township in Lehigh County, Pennsylvania. It is part of the Lehigh Valley, which has a population of 861,899 and is the 68th most populous metropolitan area in the U.S. as of the 2020 census. Neffs is located at the junction of Pennsylvania Routes 873 and 329, approximately one mile north of Schnecksville.

Historically, the town was called Unionville after the Union Church that was established there in 1797.  The town's first store was built in 1815.  The current town name honors Abraham Neff, first postmaster of the Neffs post office. Abraham Neff laid out the village while running a coach business and local hotel.  The area then became "Neffsville", a name that was later shortened to "Neffs".

The present day Neffs post office was built in 1967. At that time, the first non-agricultural manufacturing plant was built in Neffs by Ted Ambrosino, who established Ambro Fashions.  The town was so concerned about the influx of additional mail and post office activity that it applied for and won a federal grant to build an upgraded modern post office facility.

The U.S. Postal Code (ZIP code) for Neffs is 18065. It is in the 610 area code and is served by the 767 exchange in Slatington.

References
 Benjamin Leroy Miller. Lehigh County Pennsylvania: Geology and Geography Harrisburg, PA: Department of Internal Affairs

Unincorporated communities in Lehigh County, Pennsylvania
Unincorporated communities in Pennsylvania